"The Night Out" is a song by French DJ and record producer Martin Solveig from his fifth studio album, Smash (2011). The song was released as the album's fourth and final single on 2 April 2012. The track has charted in Belgium and Germany.

Music video
The music video for "The Night Out" premiered on 17 April 2012. The video features fellow DJs A-Trak, Dillon Francis, Sidney Samson, Laidback Luke, Madeon, Porter Robinson and Zedd. It reunites Solveig with She (Flo Lafaye) from "Hello".

Track listing
 Digital download
 "The Night Out"  – 3:52
 "The Night Out"  – 3:40
 "The Night Out"  – 6:00
 "Can't Stop" – 3:37
 "Hello"  – 3:04
 "Ready to Go"  – 4:32
 "Big in Japan"  – 5:30
 "The Night Out"  – 5:17
 "The Night Out"  – 5:55
 "The Night Out"  – 5:08
 "The Night Out"  – 4:15

Credits
 Written and produced by: Martin Solveig
 Composed by: Martin Solveig, Michaël Tordjman
 Lead vocals, backing vocals, other instruments and programming: Martin Solveig
 Guitar: Jean-Baptiste Gaudray
 Additional synthesizer: Michaël Tordjman
 Mixed by: Martin Solveig and Philippe Weiss at Red Room Studio, Suresnes

Charts

Year-end charts

Release history

See also
 List of number-one dance singles of 2012 (U.S.)

References

2012 singles
2012 songs
Martin Solveig songs
Mercury Records singles
Songs written by Martin Solveig